This is a list of notable programming languages with object-oriented programming (OOP) features, which are also listed in :Category:Object-oriented programming languages. Note that, in some contexts, the definition of an "object-oriented programming language" is not exactly the same as that of a "programming language with object-oriented features". For example, C++ is a multi-paradigm language including object-oriented paradigm; however, it is less object-oriented than some other languages such as Python and Ruby. Therefore, some people consider C++ an OOP language, while others do not or refer to it as a "semi-object-oriented programming language".

Languages with object-oriented features

ABAP
Ada 95
AmigaE
Apex
BETA
Boo
C++
C#
Ceylon
Chapel
Clarion
CLU
COBOL
Cobra
ColdFusion
Common Lisp
CorbaScript
Curl
D
Dart
DataFlex
Dylan
E
Eiffel
Sather
Elixir
Fortran 2003
FPr
FreeBASIC
F-Script
F#
Gambas
Genie
Go
Gura (programming language)
Graphtalk
IDLscript
J
J#
JADE
Java
Groovy
Join Java
X10
Julia
Kotlin
Lasso
Lava
Lingo
LISP
Logtalk
MATLAB
Modula-3
Nemerle
NetRexx
Nim
Noop
Oberon (Oberon-1)
Oberon-2
Object Pascal
Delphi
Free Pascal
Turbo Pascal
Object REXX
Objective-C
OCaml
Omnis Studio
OpenEdge Advanced Business Language
Oz, Mozart Programming System
Perl since v5
PHP since v4, greatly enhanced in v5
Power Builder
Prototype-based languages
Actor-Based Concurrent Languages: ABCL/1, ABCL/R, ABCL/R2, ABCL/c+
Agora
Cecil
ECMAScript
ActionScript
JavaScript
JScript
Etoys (in Squeak)
Io
Lua
Lisaac
MOO
NewtonScript
Obliq
REBOL
Self
Python
REALbasic
Ruby
Rust
S
R
Scala
Scriptol
Seed7
SenseTalk
Simula
Smalltalk
Self
Bistro
Squeak
Pharo
Newspeak
Squirrel
Swift
TADS
Tcl
Xotcl (similar to CLOS)
incr Tcl (itcl; similar to C++)
Transcript
TypeScript
Ubercode
Vala
Visual Basic
Visual Basic .NET (VB.NET)
VBScript
Visual Basic for Applications (VBA)
Visual FoxPro
Visual Prolog
XBase++ (extends xBase standard language)
Xojo
ZZT-oop

See also
Object-oriented language

References

External links
 

 
Object oriented